Carl Capotorto (born January 16, 1959) is an American actor, known for his portrayal of Little Paulie Germani on The Sopranos. He is also the author of Twisted Head: An Italian-American Memoir.

Filmography

Acting

Other work

References

External links
 
 Twisted Head

1959 births
Living people
21st-century American memoirists
American male television actors
American male television writers
American people of Italian descent
Entertainers from the Bronx
Male actors from New York City
Television producers from New York (state)